Rally Brazil was a rally racing event held in Brazil. Currently part of the South American Rally Championship (SARC), it has been incorporated into the World Rally Championship (WRC) calendar, in 1981 and 1982.

The winners of the rally as a WRC stage

Possible return to WRC

Rally of Brazil ran as a candidate event in 2013, for a possible inclusion in the 2014 World Rally Championship calendar. But it did not return to WRC.

References

External links
 World Rally Championship (official site)
 Rally Guide (Rally Guide)
 Rallystuff.net (Unofficial WRC News & Forum)
 RallyBase
 Rallye-Info.com  (formerly WRC-Online.net)

Rally competitions in Brazil
Recurring sporting events established in 1981
Recurring sporting events disestablished in 1982
Brazil